Song Hui-chae (Hangul: 송희채; born 29 April 1992) is a South Korean volleyball player who plays as an outside hitter for Seoul Woori Card WooriWON in the South Korean V-League. Song made his first appearance for the South Korean national team in 2012 and played all of the team's six matches at the 2012 Asian Men's Cup Volleyball Championship, where the team finished in fifth place. In 2013, he also completed in the Summer Universiade and East Asian Games as a member of the collegiate national team.

References

External links
 Song Hui-chae profile at FIVB

1992 births
Living people
South Korean men's volleyball players
Outside hitters
21st-century South Korean people
Place of birth missing (living people)